Michael Baker-Harber (5 October 1945 – 25 June 2022) was a sailor from Great Britain, who represented his country at the 1976 Summer Olympics in Kingston, Ontario, Canada as crew member in the Soling. With helmsman Iain MacDonald-Smith and fellow crew member Barry Dunning, they took the 13th place.

Baker-Harber died on 25 June 2022.

References

Sources
 

1945 births
2022 deaths
Sailors at the 1976 Summer Olympics – Soling
Olympic sailors of Great Britain
People from Uxbridge
British male sailors (sport)
Soling class sailors
World champions in sailing for Great Britain
World Champions in 5.5 Metre